The European Open Handball Championship, or "Unofficial Youth Handball Championship", is a tournament hosted by European Handball Federation and Swedish Handball Federation, which takes place in Göteborg, Sweden. It is a competition for men's U19 and women's U18.

Men's tournaments

Women's tournaments

References

External links
Partillecup.com

Handball competitions in Europe
European youth sports competitions